General Morden Carthew CB (25 October 1804 – 4 September 1888) was an officer in the service of the East India Company (E.I.C.) Army in the Madras Presidency, India and South East Asia during the mid 19th century.

Early life 
Morden Carthew was the eldest son of the Reverend Morden Carthew and Elizabeth Tweed-Pyke and was born in Frettenham, Norfolk where his father was the Rector.

Military career 
Carthew was nominated as an officer cadet by East India Company director, Sir William Taylor Money and joined the company on the 12 January 1821. Throughout his 56-year career he served in the Madras Presidency, Bengal, Burma (modern Myanmar) and Singapore.  He first arrived in Madras aboard the ship Jupiter on the 29 June 1821 as an Ensign and was appointed to the 11th Madras Native Infantry.  He was promoted from Senior Ensign to Lieutenant on 19 April 1823 and shortly after transferred to the 21st Madras Native Infantry (M.N.I.) where he would spend most of his career. Carthew continued to rise through the ranks and became Commanding Officer of the 21st M.N.I. He commanded the 21st M.N.I. in the Straits Settlement, Singapore from 1846 to 1849 and later was Divisional Commander of Pegu Province in Burma from 1861 to 1863.

Involvement in the Indian Mutiny of 1857 
On the 10 May 1857 a contingent of Sepoy soldiers rose up against the East India Company army, firstly in Meerut and then spreading quickly to Delhi, in an action that was to spread across the upper Ganges and central India and was variously known as the Indian Mutiny, Sepoy Mutiny and Indian Uprising. Carthew was promoted to the rank of Brigadier on the 18 August 1857 in order to command troops in Bengal against the mutinous Gwalior regiment.

On the 26 August 1857, Brigadier Carthew was given orders to assist in holding the Bithoor Road at Cawnpoor, preventing the Gwalior troops from entering Cawnpoor.  For several days Carthew and the E.I.C. troops succeeded in repelling the mutineers but on the evening of the 28 August 1857, following heavy fighting, Brigadier Carthew ordered the retreat of the E.I.C. troops, effectively surrendering the town of Cawnpoor to the mutineers.

Carthew's withdrawal initially drew the ire of his superior officers with his commander-in-chief, General Colin Campbell, responding to the news by dispatch, "... although his excellency fully admits the arduous nature of the service which Brigadier Carthew had been engaged during the 28th of November, he cannot recall his approval of that officers retreat on the evening of that day.  Under the instruction of Major-general Windham, his commanding officer, Brigadier Carthew had been placed in position.  No discretion of retiring [retreating] was allowed him". General Campbell's dispatch goes on to berate the Brigadier for retreating without first seeking permission from his immediate superior officer (Maj. Gen. Windham) and for failing to wait for reinforcements which Windham had already ordered to Carthew's position in Cawnpoor.  Whilst first denying any concession for retreat given to Brigadier Carthew, Major General Windham later conceded to General Campbell that he had, indeed, given permission for Carthew to withdraw from his position should the need arise, and the order to withdraw given by Carthew was correctly issued given the circumstances, thus exonerating Brigadier Carthew from any wrongdoing.

Carthew would eventually be awarded a Companion of the Order of Bath, Military Division (CB), on the 13 March 1867, in recognition of his service during the uprising.

The Banda and Kirwee Booty 
General Carthew was a claimant in the case of the Banda and Kirwee booty, a treasure hoard captured from the towns of Banda and Kirwee in Bengal by British forces under the command of Lord Clyde and General Whitlock during mop-up operations following the 1857 mutiny. The total value of the booty was estimated as in excess of £700,000 sterling in 1858 or more than £92million sterling today.  Whilst technically the property of the Crown, there were several claimants to the booty, including Mordern Carthew. In order to determine how the booty would be distributed, the case was firstly taken before the English Parliament with the argument the maritime law under which booty captured at sea is distributed among its captors should also apply to booty captured by land forces.  Parliament ultimately deferred the case and claimants to the High Court of the Admiralty where it was heard before the Right Honourable Stephen Lushington D.L.C. who ultimately awarded the entire bounty to General Whitlock for distribution among those of his troops directly involved in it's capture and denying, among other officers, General Carthew's claim.

Family 
Morden Carthew married Jemima Ewart, daughter of John Ewart of Mullock in Bombay, India, on the 16 July 1827. John Ewart is also the 4th great-grandfather of Sir Tony Blair, former Prime Minister of the United Kingdom, through Jemima's elder sister, Jane. The Ewart's were direct descendants of King James V of Scotland and other modern royals and nobles.

General Carthew inherited Woodbridge Abbey in Woodbridge Suffolk from his uncle, Admiral William Carthew and was the great great Grandson of prominent London Serjeant-at-law, Thomas Carthew esq.  He was also the brother in law and cousin of antiquarian and genealogist, George Alfred Carthew.

Together, Morden and Jemima had 10 children:

 Margaret - Born 17 September 1828 in Madras (modern Chennai), Married Lt. Col. Hugh Rigg, E.I.C. officer and Aide-de-camp to General Carthew, and later High Sheriff and Deputy Lieutenant of Westmorland and magistrate.
 Emily Jane - Born 6 November 1830
 Morden - Born 21 June 1832, would go on to have a career of note as an officer in the E.I.C. and later take on the surname Yorstoun as a requirement of inheritance.  Married Maynard Bogle, daughter of Major General Sir Archibald Bogle
 John Ewart - Born 17 November 1834, died as an infant
 Catherine Alicia - Born 27 September 1836, died as an infant
 Frederick Chalmers - Born 28 March 1840, died as an infant
 Charles Alfred - Born 3 September 1841
 Jemima Fanny - Born 24 December 1842, died aged 19 in 1862
 Mary - Born 3 July 1844
 Ewart - Born 24 January 1847

Morden Carthew CB retired under Royal Warrant on the 1 October 1877 and was promoted to full General upon retirement and passed away on the 4 September 1888 at Denton, Norfolk.

References 

1804 births
1888 deaths